A metaborate is a borate anion consisting of boron and oxygen, with empirical formula . Metaborate also refers to any salt or ester of such anion (e.g. salts such as sodium metaborate  or calcium metaborate , and esters such as methyl metaborate ). Metaborate is one of the boron's oxoanions. Metaborates can be monomeric, oligomeric or polymeric.

In aqueous solutions metaborate anion hydrolyzes to tetrahydroxyborate . For this reason, solutions or hydrated salts of the latter are often improperly named "metaborates".

Structure

Solid state
In the solid state of their salts, metaborate ions are often oligomeric or polymeric, conceptually resulting from the fusion of two or more  through shared oxygen atoms. In these anions, the boron atom forms covalent bonds with either three or four oxygen atoms. Some of the structures are:
This form is found, for example, in some anhydrous alkali metal salts like sodium metaborate or potassium metaborate, in α- and β-barium metaborate , and in the mixed salt potassium cadmium metaborate . The three B–O distances are nearly equal in the potassium salt (133.1, 139.8, and 139.8 pm) but significantly different in the sodium one (128.0, 143.3, and 143.3 pm).

 A polymer of  units connected by single shared-oxygen bridges; that is, .

 A tridimensional network of  tetrahedral groups, as in "zinc metaborate", which is actually a mixed salt zinc metaborate oxide, with the formula .

 A tridimensional regular array of  tetrahedra sharing oxygen vertices, as in the high-pressure and high-temperature γ form of lithium metaborate .

Aqueous solution
The cyclic trimer anions dissociate almost completely in aqueous solution giving mainly tetrahydroxyborate anions: 
  3 

However, this claim has been disproved.

Gas phase
The vapor of cesium metaborate has neutral monomers  and dimers  as well as ionized versions thereof. The same situation holds for thallium metaborate .

Solid solutions
In 1964 Hisatsune and Surez investigated the infrared spectrum of metaborate anions in dilute solid solutions of potassium salt in alkali halides such as potassium chloride KCl.

Preparation

References

 

Borate minerals
 
Industrial minerals
Inorganic compounds
Oxyanions